The 2012 Balkan Athletics Indoor Championships was the 17th edition of the annual indoor track and field competition for athletes from the Balkans, organised by Balkan Athletics. It was held on 18 February at the Ataköy Athletics Arena in Istanbul, Turkey. The competition was the first international event to be hosted at the newly-constructed Ataköy Athletics Arena, following the Turkish Indoor Athletics Championships in January and preceding the 2012 IAAF World Indoor Championships held in March. It also marked the re-launch of the Balkan Indoor Championships under the aegis of Turkey – the Hellenic Amateur Athletic Association had organised the event up to 2009 but the 2010 and 2011 championships were cancelled due to funding issues stemming from the Greek government-debt crisis.

Results

Men

Women

References

Results
17th BALKAN INDOOR SENIOR CHAMPIONSHIPS Men. Balkan Athletics. Retrieved 2020-02-03.
17th BALKAN INDOOR SENIOR CHAMPIONSHIPS Women. Balkan Athletics. Retrieved 2020-02-03.

External links
Balkan Athletics website

2012
Balkan Athletics Indoor Championships
Balkan Athletics Indoor Championships
Balkan Athletics Indoor Championships
Balkan Athletics Indoor Championships
Balkan Athletics Indoor Championships
International athletics competitions hosted by Turkey
Sports competitions in Istanbul
Sport in Bakırköy